Xylotachina is a genus of flies in the family Tachinidae.

Species
X. diluta (Meigen, 1824)
X. vulnerans Mesnil, 1953

References

Diptera of Asia
Diptera of Europe
Exoristinae
Tachinidae genera
Taxa named by Friedrich Moritz Brauer
Taxa named by Julius von Bergenstamm